Al Cohn's America is a jazz album by saxophonist Al Cohn, recorded in 1976 for Xanadu Records.

Reception
The Allmusic review by Scott Yanow stated "Al Cohn's series of albums for Xanadu were among the happiest and most exciting of his career. Freed of his usual writing duties, Cohn sounds exuberant jamming through seven songs".

Track listing
"America the Beautiful" (Katherine Lee Bates, Samuel A. Ward) - 5:04
"Night and Day" (Cole Porter) - 8:34
 "My Shining Hour" (Harold Arlen, Johnny Mercer) - 8:33
 "Bright" (Al Cohn) - 5:09
 "Skylark" (Hoagy Carmichael, Johnny Mercer) - 6:18
 "Woody'n You" (Dizzy Gillespie) - 5:54
 "Comin' Home" (Franz Jackson) - 6:06

Personnel 
 Al Cohn – sax
 Barry Harris – piano
 Sam Jones – Double Bass
 Leroy Williams – drums

References

1975 albums
Xanadu Records albums
Al Cohn albums
Albums produced by Don Schlitten